Anarsia beitunica is a moth in the family Gelechiidae. It was described by Hou-Hun Li and Zhe-Min Zheng in 1997. It is found in China.

References

beitunica
Moths described in 1997
Moths of Asia